The Woman's Anti-Franchise League was a short lived Australian organisation opposed to women's suffrage, active at the start of the twentieth century.

References

Anti-suffragist organizations
Political organisations based in Australia
Women's suffrage in Australia